Cowboy is the eighth studio album by English synth-pop duo Erasure, released on 31 March 1997 by Mute Records. In the United States, it was released by Madonna's former label Maverick Records. Cowboy was produced by Gareth Jones and Neil McLellan and marked the band's return to more simplistic three-minute synth-pop music.

After disappointing sales and chart placing of their previous studio album, Erasure, Cowboy returned the duo to the top 10 of the UK Albums Chart and it contains three singles (two of which hit the UK top 30). In the US, Cowboy greatly improved Erasure's Billboard 200 peak over their previous album, and first single "In My Arms" gave them another Hot 100 entry.  Sales also improved in Germany, where Cowboy peaked at number thirty-four.

The album contains eleven Vince Clarke/Andy Bell originals in its UK version.  For its US release, the album artwork was changed slightly, the original version of "In My Arms" was replaced with a slightly different US mix and two bonus tracks were added: a cover version of Blondie's "Rapture" (with Clarke providing the rap); and a version of the Burt Bacharach/Hal David song "Magic Moments" originally recorded by Perry Como that Erasure had contributed to the Lord of Illusions soundtrack.

Erasure embarked on another major tour of the UK and US to promote this album, in their trademark style it contained elaborate stage settings and costumes (including Clarke dressed as a guitar-playing cactus).

Track listing 
All tracks written by Andy Bell and Vince Clarke, except where noted.

 "Rain" – 4:10
 "Worlds on Fire" – 3:37
 "Reach Out" – 3:47
 "In My Arms" – 3:28
 "Don't Say Your Love Is Killing Me" – 3:46
 "Precious" – 3:31
 "Treasure" – 3:04
 "Boy" – 3:41
 "How Can I Say" – 3:17
 "Save Me Darling" – 4:01
 "Love Affair" – 3:39
 "Rapture" (Debbie Harry/Chris Stein) – 6:34 (US-only bonus track)
 "Magic Moments" (Burt Bacharach/Hal David) – 2:37 (US-only bonus track)

2016 "Erasure 30" 30th anniversary BMG reissue LP
Subsequent to their acquisition of Erasure's back catalog, and in anticipation of the band's 30th anniversary, BMG commissioned reissues of all previously released UK editions of Erasure albums up to and including 2007's Light at the End of the World. All titles were pressed and distributed by Play It Again Sam on 180-gram vinyl and shrinkwrapped with a custom anniversary sticker.

Personnel
 Tracie Ackerman – Vocals (background)
 Jordan Bailey – Vocals (background)
 Andy Bell – Voices
 Andy Caine – Vocals (background)
 Vince Clarke – Multi Instruments
 Graham Dominy – Assistant Engineer
 Larimie Garcia – Design
 Luke Gifford – Engineer
 George Holt – Engineer
 Gareth Jones – Producer
 Neil McLellan – Producer
 Kevin Reagan – Design
 Sam Smith – Vocals (background)
 Mark "Spike" Stent – Mixing
 Darren Tai – Assistant Engineer
 Paul Walton – Assistant Engineer

Charts

Release history

References

1997 albums
Albums produced by Gareth Jones (music producer)
Erasure albums
Maverick Records albums
Mute Records albums